is a town located in Ibi District, Gifu Prefecture, Japan. , the town had an estimated population of 24,034 in 8291 households and a population density of 620 persons per km2.

Geography
Ikeda is located in southwestern Gifu Prefecture. The Ibi River flows through the town, which is hilly to mountainous in the west, including Mount Ikeda on the border with the neighbouring town of Ibigawa. Parts of the town are within the borders of the Ibi-Sekigahara-Yōrō Quasi-National Park. The town has a climate characterized by hot and humid summers, and mild winters (Köppen climate classification Cfa). The average annual temperature in Ikeda is 15.0 °C. The average annual rainfall is 1991 mm with September as the wettest month. The temperatures are highest on average in August, at around 27.5 °C, and lowest in January, at around 3.6 °C.

Neighbouring municipalities
Gifu Prefecture
Ōgaki
Ibigawa
Ōno
Gōdo
Tarui

Demographics
Per Japanese census data, the population of Ikeda has recently plateaued after a long period of growth.

History
The area around Ibigawa was part of traditional Mino Province. During the Edo period, it was part of Ikeda District and was divided between territory controlled by Ōgaki Domain and tenryō holdings directly controlled by the Tokugawa shogunate. During the post-Meiji Restoration cadastral reforms, the area was organised into Ibi District, Gifu Prefecture. The village of Ikeda was formed on July 1, 1897, with the merger of the villages of Ikeno, Ueda, Shimohigashino, Sunabata, Rokunoi, and Sugino. Ikega merged with neighbouring Rokugō and Hongō in 1950 and was raised to town status on May 1, 1954. Ikeda annexed neighbouring Yahata and Miaji on April 1, 1955.

Education
Ikeda has five public elementary schools and one public middle school operated by the town government. The town has one public high school operated by the Gifu Prefectural Board of Education.

Transportation

Railway
 Yōrō Railway Yōrō Line
 -  -

Highway

Local attractions
Mount Ikeda

References

External links

 

 
Towns in Gifu Prefecture
Ibi District, Gifu